Herpetogramma abdominalis is a moth in the family Crambidae. It was described by Zeller in 1872. It is found in North America, where it has been recorded from Illinois, Kentucky, Maine, Maryland, Massachusetts, Michigan, Minnesota, Mississippi, Missouri, New Brunswick, New Hampshire, New Jersey, New York, North Carolina, North Dakota, Nova Scotia, Ohio, Ontario, Oregon, Quebec, Tennessee, Washington and West Virginia.

The wingspan is 22–35 mm. Adults usually have light orangish brown costa and a white ground colour. Adults are on wing from April to September.

The larvae feed on Laportea canadensis.

References

Moths described in 1872
Herpetogramma
Moths of North America